The Ministry of Works and Supply is a ministry in Zambia. It is headed by the Minister of Works and Supply.

History
In 2011 the ministry was merged with the Ministry of Transport and Communications to form the Ministry of Transport, Works, Supply and Communication. The merger was reversed in 2015.

List of ministers

Deputy ministers

References

Works and Supply